Lemense Futebol Clube is a Brazilian professional association football club based in Leme, São Paulo who currently compete in the Campeonato Paulista Série A2, the second tier of the São Paulo state football league.

History
The club was founded on 12 December 2005 as Sport Club Atibaia, and professionalized its football department in the same year, when they competed in their first professional competition, the Campeonato Paulista Segunda Divisão. They achieved promotion to the Campeonato Paulista Série A3 in 2014, and reached another promotion to the Campeonato Paulista Série A2 in 2018, the latter as champions.

On 29 November 2021, Atibaia's president Alexandre Barbosa confirmed that the club would leave the city of Atibaia and move to Leme instead, taking over the name, shield and identity of Esporte Clube Lemense.

Stadium
Lemense FC play their home games at Estádio Bruno Lazzarini.

Honours

Campeonato Paulista Série A3:
Winners (1): 2018.

References

Association football clubs established in 2005
Football clubs in São Paulo (state)
2005 establishments in Brazil